Auto-Owners Insurance Group is a mutual insurance company that provides life, home, car and business insurance. Their policies are sold exclusively through local and independent insurance agents within their 26 operating states.

History
In 1916, Vern V. Moulton and four other associates organized Auto-Owners Insurance Company in Mount Pleasant, Michigan. In 1917, the company moved its headquarters to Lansing, Michigan.  Here, the home office has remained.

Auto-Owners began writing insurance in Indiana, its first state outside of Michigan, in 1935. They now offer insurance in 26 states through local, independent insurance agents.

The company has been a member of the Fortune 500 since 2003. In 2020, Auto-Owners Insurance was listed at number 320.

Auto-Owners Insurance Group Companies 
 Auto-Owners Insurance Company
 Auto-Owners Life Insurance Company
 Owners Insurance Company
 Home-Owners Insurance Company
 Property-Owners Insurance Company
 Southern-Owners Insurance Company
 Atlantic Casualty Insurance Company
 Concord Group Insurance Companies
 Capital Insurance Group

References

External links
 
 Auto-Owners Insurance Blog

1916 establishments in Michigan
American companies established in 1916
Companies based in Michigan
Eaton County, Michigan
Financial services companies established in 1916
Insurance companies of the United States
Mutual insurance companies of the United States